Yésica Toscanini (born 26 March 1986) is a professional Argentine fashion model. She was born in Junín, Argentina.

She appeared in the 2006 and 2007 Sports Illustrated Swimsuit Issues. She was photographed for the cover of the Argentine edition of Cosmopolitan and twice for Para Ti magazine. She also appeared in the Abercrombie & Fitch catalog of 2006. She played the high school sweetheart of Enrique Iglesias in the music video for "Do You Know? (The Ping Pong Song)". In 2008 she was selected as the girl for the Intimissimi spring–summer ad campaign.

Through legal counsel she requested, and was granted the right, to have all her images and data to be removed from Yahoo! search results in Argentina.

References

External links
 Profile from AskMen.com

 Dotto Models Profile
 The Internet Fashion Database

1986 births
Living people
Argentine female models
21st-century Argentine women